Welkenraedt is a railway station in the town of Welkenraedt, Liège, Belgium. The station opened on 24 October 1843 and is located on the 37, 39 and 49. The train services are operated by National Railway Company of Belgium (NMBS).

Train services
The station is served by the following services:

Intercity services (IC-01) Ostend - Bruges - Gent - Brussels - Leuven - Liège - Welkenraedt - Eupen
Intercity services (IC-12) Kortrijk - Gent - Brussels - Leuven - Liège - Welkenraedt (weekdays)
Local services (L-09) Spa - Pepinster - Verviers - Welkenraedt - Aachen

See also
 List of railway stations in Belgium

References

External links
 
 Welkenraedt railway station at Belgian Railways website

Railway stations in Belgium
1843 establishments in Belgium
Railway stations in Liège Province
Welkenraedt
Railway stations in Belgium opened in 1843